The Battle of Vihiers (18 July 1793) was a battle between Royalist and Republican French forces at Vihiers during the War in the Vendée. After the Republican division under Jacques-Marie Pilote La Barolière advanced into the heart of the revolt area, it was attacked by the Vendeans under Dominique Piron de La Vienne and routed. The advance guard under Jacques-François Menou held its ground for a long time, but many Republican units from the main body quickly took to their heels. The Republican cavalry under Louis-Nicolas Davout covered the disorderly retreat. The Royalists suffered about 1,000 killed and wounded but inflicted 2,000 killed and wounded on their enemies as well as capturing 3,000 soldiers and 25 artillery pieces.

References

Battles involving France
Conflicts in 1793
Battles of the War in the Vendée
Battles in Pays de la Loire
History of Maine-et-Loire
1793 in France